Brockworth is a village and parish in the Borough of Tewkesbury, Gloucestershire, England, situated on the old Roman road that connects the City of Gloucester with Barnwood. The population taken at the 2011 census was 7,387. The population increased to 9,422 at the 2021 Census.

Since the mid-20th century, Brockworth has been known locally for the annual rolling of Double Gloucester cheese down Cooper's Hill. During World War II the nearby village of Hucclecote at the Gloster Aircraft Company produced the famous Hawker Hurricane fighter, and following the war it gained renewed fame for producing several notable aircraft, including Britain's first jet aircraft, which was test flown here. Brockworth is also the birthplace of actor, comedian and writer Simon Pegg.

Governance
An electoral ward of the same name exists in Tewkesbury Borough. The population and area of this ward are identical to that shown above.

Brockworth has a parish council.

History

The name Brockworth is derived from the Saxon "wurthin" for enclosure and "broc" for brook. Settlement is believed to have occurred around 600 AD, after the defeat of the Gloucester-based Romano British at the Battle of Dyrham in 577 AD. Older, Roman remains have been found locally but they indicate an estate rather than a village. Also, the Saxon-derived name suggests that the first settlers were Saxons.

The oldest surviving building in the village is the Grade I listed building St George's Church, which dates back to 1142. The present structure has elements from then until the nineteenth century. Adjacent to this is the Tudor manor house Brockworth Court, a Grade II* listed building, that was built between 1534 and 1539 for Richard Hart, the last prior of Llanthony Priory.

Brockworth was the third in a series of rural villages located along an old Roman road following a more-or-less straight line to the inland port city of Gloucester. Its original semi-remote location made it ideal for the location of an aircraft factory (now the Gloucester Business Park) where aeroplanes could be built and tested without worries about noise. Also, land availability made the area ideal for a flight test airfield.

Gloster Aircraft Company
The Gloster Aircraft Company was first formed at Hucclecote, Gloucestershire in 1915, as the Gloucestershire Aircraft Company. In 1926 the name of the company was abbreviated to Gloster Aircraft Company because customers outside of the United Kingdom found the original name too difficult to pronounce. In May 1934 the company was purchased by Hawker Aircraft but the company name was unchanged.

From 1921 the company produced the following aircraft types: Sparrowhawk, Nighthawk, Nightjar, Grouse, Grebe, Gamecock, Gorcock, Guan, Gambit, Gnatsnapper, Gauntlet, Gladiator, Hawker Hurricane; Hawker Typhoon; Gloster Meteor and Gloster Javelin and its runway became famous for the first flight of Sir Frank Whittle's turbo-jet aircraft.

Brockworth bombed
The Gloster Aircraft Company (known locally as GAC) drew upon an employment pool from the surrounding area and it was responsible for much of the growth in the development of housing estates which was halted by the outbreak of World War II. During the war Brockworth and the surrounding area were bombed by the Luftwaffe in an attempt to halt the production of aircraft.

1939–45 WWII production
As the pre-war biplane Gladiator was rapidly rendered obsolete by faster monoplanes the Brockworth factory was available to manufacture Hawker aircraft. In 1939 the company built 1,000 Hawker Hurricanes in the first 12 months of World War II and it delivered the last of 2,750 Hurricanes in 1942. Production was then switched to building 3,330 Hawker Typhoons for the Royal Air Force. On 8 April 1941 the first test flight of the Gloster E28/39 with a single turbo-jet engine (invented by Sir Frank Whittle) took off from the company's flight test airfield at Brockworth. This was followed by the twin-engined Gloster Meteor, the only jet to be used by the Allied Forces during World War II. The speed of the Meteor enabled it to fly alongside V1 flying bombs, tip them off course, to crash before they could arrive at their London target.

Post-WWII developments
Following World War II it took the area many years to revive; but after the mid-1950s, renewed housing growth, the development of motorways and redistricting eventually changed the entire look of Brockworth and what were once adjoining villages. In 1952 the Brockworth factory produced the two seat, delta-winged Gloster Javelin which was developed as an all weather fighter that could fly above 50,000 feet at almost the speed of sound. In 1962 the Gloster Aircraft Company closed down and its once famous runway fell victim of redistricting and it is now within the boundary of Hucclecote. The airfield has now been redeveloped as the modern Gloucester Business Park, with additional housing developments continuing to grow around it.

Cooper's Hill
Cooper's Hill is a local landmark within the parish of Brockworth, and is known in Britain and beyond for its annual cheese rolling contest. A large round cheese is rolled down the steep slope of the hill and chased by a group of "runners", who in fact spend most of their brief descent to the bottom of the hill falling and tumbling. Two hundred years ago this was part of a larger mid-summer festival with other activities and competitions, but the event is now confined to the cheese-rolling and is held in May during the Spring Bank-holiday Monday. It is usually said to have originated as a pagan festival celebrating the arrival of summer, fertility, or both.

The contest was the subject of the BBC One programme The Great Cheese Chase broadcast in 2018.

The Witcombe Festival was originally held at the bottom of Coopers Hill but since 2018 has been in Brockworth Road.

See also
Coopers Edge

References

Sources

Gloster Javelin pictures and story
Cooper's Hill Annual Cheese Rolling and Wake
BBC coverage of the 2004 Cheese Rolling event 
Injuries suffered at 2004 annual Cheese Rolling.
Video of the 2014 Cheese Rolling at Cooper's Hill
More about Frank Whittle
Royal Air Force History of the Gloster E28/39/Meteor
Hucclecote Parish where the E28/39 aircraft, with a jet engine designed by Sir Frank Whittle, became airborne in taxiing runs for the first time.

 

Villages in Gloucestershire
Borough of Tewkesbury